Charles Hall (1843 – 29 May 1937) was a Liberal Party Member of Parliament in New Zealand. He represented the Waipawa electorate from 1893 to 1896 when he was defeated, then from 1899 to 1911 when he retired.

Biography

Early life
Hall was born at Malton, Yorkshire in 1843. His first wife, Eliza died in her youth leaving Hall a widower. They had one child, a daughter. Hall decided to shift to New Zealand and arrived at Napier in the ship Countess of Kintore in 1875 and entered the building trade upon arrival. Hall started up trade in Napier where he married Marian Dinsdale in 1878, the marriage issued two children one daughter and one son. He was keenly interested in land settlement and in 1880 took up a bush section in northern Manawatu. His family's home was destroyed in a bush fire and he and his family moved to Woodville where he again entered the building trade.

Due to his active interest in land settlement, he assisted in the settlement of the Hall and Malton blocks near Woodville and was also an original selector in the Mangahao block, near Pahiatua. Due to his service in land settlements he was appointed by the government to serve as a selector for government land subdivisions.

Political career

Hall had a long, and active public life. He started his career locally holding many civil authority positions, serving as the Mayor of Woodville, chairman of the Waipawa County Council, District Coroner, a member of the Waipawa Licensing Committee and a member of the Hawke's Bay Education Board.

In  Hall was elected to Parliament as MP for Waipawa as the Liberal Party candidate. At the next election he lost his seat to the Conservative candidate George Hunter. In  he won the seat back and would retain it until the  election when he chose to retire from national politics.

Later life and death
After retiring from Parliament Hall travelled back to England and stayed there for three years before returning in 1915 and settling in Dannevirke. His second wife died in 1918 and Hall himself died in 1937 in Wellington aged 95 years old. He was survived by all three of his children.

Notes

References

|-

1843 births
1937 deaths
New Zealand Liberal Party MPs
New Zealand MPs for North Island electorates
English emigrants to New Zealand
Unsuccessful candidates in the 1896 New Zealand general election
19th-century New Zealand politicians
20th-century New Zealand politicians
Local politicians in New Zealand
Members of the New Zealand House of Representatives